Ionelia Zaharia (née Neacșu; born 13 August 1985) is a Romanian rower. She competed in the women's Double Sculls at the 2008 Summer Olympics.

External links
 
 

1985 births
Living people
Romanian female rowers
Olympic rowers of Romania
Rowers at the 2008 Summer Olympics
World Rowing Championships medalists for Romania